Branden John Grace (born 20 May 1988) is a professional golfer from South Africa who currently plays for LIV Golf. He formerly played on the European Tour, the PGA Tour, and the Sunshine Tour. In 2012, he became the first player in the history of the European Tour to win his first four European Tour titles in the same year.

On 22 July 2017, Grace became the first man to record a sub-63 score in a major when he shot a 62 (8-under-par) in the Open Championship at Royal Birkdale Golf Club.

Amateur career
Grace was born in Pretoria. As an amateur he participated in the Ernie Els and Fancourt Foundation. He won the South African Amateur Stroke Play Championship in 2006. He turned professional in 2007.

Professional career

Early years
Grace played on the Challenge Tour in 2007 which is Europe's second-tier tour. He only played in eight events but recorded two top-ten finishes. In 2008 he played on the Challenge Tour and the Sunshine Tour. He finished 35th on the Challenge Tour's Order of Merit while recording three top-10 finishes including finishing in a tie for second at the Ypsilon Golf Challenge. He then earned his European Tour card for 2009 through qualifying school.

In 2009, Grace struggled on the European Tour but finished in a tie for second at the Africa Open on the Sunshine Tour, behind winner Retief Goosen. He finished in the top 10 in seven of the nine Sunshine Tour events that he played in en route to an 11th-place finish on the Order of Merit. He picked up his first professional win in 2010 at the Coca-Cola Charity Championship on the Sunshine Tour. In 2011 he finished 24th on the Challenge Tour's Order of Merit while recording five top-10 finishes. He also finished 7th on the Sunshine Tour's Order of Merit. He went back to qualifying school to earn his European Tour card for 2012.

2012: Breakthrough season
In January he won the Joburg Open which was co-sanctioned by the European Tour and the Sunshine Tour. He won by one stroke over Jamie Elson. He then won the Volvo Golf Champions the following week to make it back-to-back European Tour victories, beating his veteran compatriots Ernie Els and Retief Goosen in a playoff with a birdie on the first hole. Grace became the first player since Fred Couples in 1995 to follow his first victory with another consecutively. As a result, Grace moved inside the world's top 100 in the Official World Golf Ranking.

On 22 April, Grace won his third tournament on the European Tour when he won the Volvo China Open. Only two players have won three European Tour titles in a single season at a younger age, Seve Ballesteros did it three times between 1977 and 1980, and Sandy Lyle did it in 1979. Grace also became only the third South African to win three times in a single season, joining Ernie Els and Retief Goosen. He also became only the second player in European Tour history to win three times in the season after graduating from qualifying school.

In September, Grace captured his third Sunshine Tour title at the Vodacom Origins of Golf Final. On 7 October, Grace won his fourth European Tour title and fifth worldwide title of 2012 at the Alfred Dunhill Links Championship. He broke the scoring record at the tournament to win at 22 under par, two strokes clear of Thorbjørn Olesen. His record total included a European Tour record equalling 60 at Kingsbarns during the first round. Grace moved to third in the Race to Dubai and also to a career high 37th in the Official World Golf Ranking. Grace capped off a highly successful 2012 season by winning the Sunshine Tour Order of Merit.

2013–2016
Grace had a less successful season in 2013, finishing 18th on the European Tour's Race to Dubai, his best finish being second in the Aberdeen Asset Management Scottish Open where he lost in a sudden-death playoff to Phil Mickelson. During 2014, Grace continued his high showings on the European Tour Race to Dubai. Despite a second winless season, Grace finished 31st in the year end standings, with a best performance of second in the Volvo Golf Champions.

In December 2014, as part of the 2015 European Tour season, Grace won his fifth European Tour event, and first since 2012, at the Alfred Dunhill Championship. Grace won the event by 7 strokes from fellow South African Louis Oosthuizen. Grace soon followed this up with his second win of the 2015 season with a win at the Commercial Bank Qatar Masters in January 2015. The following month, he won again on home soil at the Dimension Data Pro-Am on the Sunshine Tour, with a two stroke victory over Keith Horne.

At the 2015 U.S. Open at Chambers Bay, Grace held a share of the lead through 54 holes. On Sunday, he was in the penultimate group with eventual champion, Jordan Spieth, and was still tied for the lead heading to the 16th hole, until he blocked his drive to the right and out of bounds, forcing him to re-tee and eventually leading to a double bogey to spiral him out of contention to win. He finished with a final round 71, and a tied for 4th position. At the 2015 PGA Championship at Whistling Straits Grace placed in the top-five for the second time in his career at the major championships, when he placed third.

At the 2015 Presidents Cup, Grace would have a perfect week. On the opening day (Thursday foursomes), Grace teamed with fellow South African Louis Oosthuizen to defeat Matt Kuchar and Patrick Reed in comfortable fashion 3 and 2. On Day 2 (Friday fourball), Grace would again team with Oosthuizen in a dominant performance against world number one Jordan Spieth and Dustin Johnson winning 4 and 3. On Day 3 (Saturday morning foursomes), Grace for a third time teaming with Oosthuizen, won in another comfortable match 3 and 2, defeating the team of Reed and Rickie Fowler. Later in the day during (Saturday afternoon fourball), teaming with Oosthuizen a fourth and final time, the team won its fourth match against the undefeated duo of Bubba Watson and J. B. Holmes. The fourball match being the only time Grace would see the 18th hole all week, his team winning 1 up at the last. On the final day of the event (Sunday singles), Grace played against Kuchar and started out red hot, dominating Kuchar on the front nine. Kuchar fought back from several holes down before losing 2 and 1. Grace's perfect record of 5–0–0 was the fifth such occasion in Presidents Cup history and just the second time for the International side.

On 30 January 2016, Grace defended his Commercial Bank Qatar Masters title for his seventh victory on the European Tour. He finished two strokes ahead of Rafa Cabrera-Bello and Thorbjørn Olesen, after shooting a three under round of 69 on a day when he started two back of leader Paul Lawrie. Grace became the first player to successfully defend the tournament.

Grace was able to play on the PGA Tour in 2016, in the "Top 125 Non-member" category. This followed his successes in the 2015 majors and other PGA-recognised tournaments. On 17 April 2016, Grace claimed his first PGA Tour victory at the RBC Heritage after shooting a final round 66.

2017
On 22 July, Grace shot a 62 in the third round of the Open Championship at the Royal Birkdale Golf Club in Southport, England, setting a record for the lowest round in a men's major championship.

{|class="wikitable" span = 50 style="font-size:85%;
|-
|  style="background:Pink; width:10px;"|
|Birdie
|}

In November 2017, Grace won the Nedbank Golf Challenge at the Gary Player Country Club in Sun City, North West province, South Africa. This victory was worth $1,166,660.

2019
In January 2019, Grace started working with Scottish caddie, Craig Connelly.

2020
In January, Grace fired a final round 62 to win the South African Open. The victory capped a unique milestone for Grace. Previously in his career, he had won every significant tournament in South African golf: Joburg Open (2012), Alfred Dunhill Championship (2014), the Dimension Data Pro-Am (2015) and the Nedbank Golf Challenge (2017). The national Open was the only one missing.

2021
In February, Grace finished eagle-birdie at the Puerto Rico Open to claim his second PGA Tour victory.

In August, Grace tied for the lead with five other players after 72 holes at the Wyndham Championship. Kevin Kisner took the title in the playoff.

Professional wins (15)

PGA Tour wins (2)

PGA Tour playoff record (0–1)

European Tour wins (9)

1Co-sanctioned by the Sunshine Tour
2Co-sanctioned by the OneAsia Tour

European Tour playoff record (1–1)

Sunshine Tour wins (6)

1Co-sanctioned by the European Tour

LIV Golf Invitational Series wins (1)

Playoff record
Challenge Tour playoff record (0–1)

Results in major championships
Results not in chronological order in 2020.

CUT = missed the half-way cut
"T" = tied
NT = No tournament due to COVID-19 pandemic

Summary

Most consecutive cuts made – 6 (2016 U.S. Open – 2017 Open Championship)
Longest streak of top-10s – 1 (six times)

Results in The Players Championship

CUT = missed the halfway cut
"T" indicates a tie for a place
C = Cancelled after the first round due to the COVID-19 pandemic

Results in World Golf Championships
Results not in chronological order prior to 2015.

1Cancelled due to COVID-19 pandemic

QF, R16, R32, R64 = Round in which player lost in match play
NT = No tournament
"T" = Tied

Team appearances
Professional
Presidents Cup (representing the International team): 2013, 2015, 2017
World Cup (representing South Africa): 2013

See also
2008 European Tour Qualifying School graduates
2011 European Tour Qualifying School graduates
List of golfers with most European Tour wins

References

External links

South African male golfers
Sunshine Tour golfers
European Tour golfers
PGA Tour golfers
LIV Golf players
Sportspeople from Pretoria
People from George, South Africa
White South African people
1988 births
Living people